Ancylodes pallens is a species of snout moth in the genus Ancylodes. It was described by Émile Louis Ragonot in 1887 and is known from Iran, Iraq, Spain, Croatia, Greece, Russia, Kazakhstan and North Africa. It is a very rare immigrant to southern Great Britain.

The wingspan is 18–20 mm.

References

Moths described in 1887
Phycitini
Moths of Europe
Moths of Asia
Moths of Africa